Solitaire Global Schools (commonly called SGS) is a group of schools based in Hyderabad, Telangana, India. It was established in June 2017 and has two branches in Hyderabad at Attapur and Kattedan. The school provides the Cambridge Assessment International Education (CAIE) curriculum for the pre-primary, primary and secondary grade students. The school also provides Cambridge Advanced classes for higher grade students.  The school is a member of AFS and India-based Members of International Schools Association (MISA).

During the lockdown in India from the Covid-19 pandemic, the school released its own online learning platform called SI Learner's Hub.

The school's students volunteer in the community by taking care of park adopted by the school.

Academics 
The school follows the Cambridge Assessment International Education curriculum as such they provide the following programmes for the students education.

 Cambridge Primary (5 to 11 years old)
 Cambridge lower secondary (11 to 14 years old)
 Cambridge upper secondary (14 to 16 years old)
 Cambridge advanced (16 to 19 years old)

The school has a large campus of 3 acres for several sports activities like cricket, football and basketball.

References

External links 

 www.solitaireglobalschools.com/
htt Schools in India
Education in India ps://www.aninews.in/news/business/business/solitaire-global-schools-where-community-service-and-academics-go-hand-in-hand20210308132102/
https://www.business-standard.com/content/press-releases-ani/solitaire-global-schools-where-community-service-and-academics-go-hand-in-hand-121030800477_1.html
https://in.finance.yahoo.com/news/solitaire-global-schools-where-community-075409140.html
https://www.zee5.com/zee5news/solitaire-global-schools-where-community-service-and-academics-go-hand-in-hand
https://english.lokmat.com/business/solitaire-global-schools-where-community-service-and-academics-go-hand-in-hand/